Christopher Daniel Britton (born December 16, 1982) is a right-handed former Major League Baseball relief pitcher.

High school
Britton attended Plantation High School in Florida.  He was first-team All-Broward County and second team All-State.

Baseball career

Draft
Britton was drafted by the Baltimore Orioles in the eighth round (233rd overall) of the 2001 MLB draft.

Minor leagues
As of August 14, 2007, he has averaged 7.6 hits, 2.9 walks, and 9.5 strikeouts per nine innings in the Minor Leagues.

In 2005, Britton was a High-A All-Star. He was 6-0 that year with a 1.60 ERA, and in 78.2 innings, he gave up only 47 hits and 23 walks while striking out 110 batters.

Baltimore Orioles
As a rookie with the Orioles in 2006, Britton made 52 relief appearances, and was 0–2 with a 3.35 ERA while allowing 46 hits and recording 41 strikeouts and 17 walks in 53.2 innings pitched.

New York Yankees
On November 12, 2006, the Orioles traded Britton to the New York Yankees for right-handed pitcher Jaret Wright and $4 million. He started the season at AAA Scranton but was called up on April 15, 2007, after a string of injuries to starting pitching and a pair of extra inning games. He made his first appearance with the Yankees two days later, on April 17, pitching a scoreless ninth inning. He was recalled on August 29, 2007, with Sean Henn getting sent down to AAA. On June 6, 2008, Britton was placed on the disabled list.

Following the 2008 season, Britton was non-tendered by the Yankees, making him a free agent.

San Diego Padres
On December 19, 2008, the Padres announced the signing of Britton to a minor league deal. On May 25, 2009, the Padres released Britton due to a poor start at Triple-A.

In 15 appearances for the Padres Double-A and Triple-A teams, Britton threw 20 innings, allowed 24 earned runs, 39 hits and 8 walks and struck out 10, with an ERA of 10.45.

Independent baseball
Britton signed with the York Revolution of the Independent Atlantic League of Professional Baseball for the 2009 season.  He signed with the Lincoln Saltdogs of the American Association for the 2010 season. He was released from the Saltdogs on June 28, 2010.

Weight
At 275 pounds, Britton was one of the heaviest players in baseball. The only other major leaguers who were listed as heavy or heavier at the time were CC Sabathia, Jonathan Broxton, Bobby Jenks, Adam Dunn, and Dmitri Young.

"Brittongate"
While Britton has generally put up good minor league numbers and had success with the Orioles during the 2006 season, he has been generally overlooked by the Yankees. Yankees fan blogs, which generally bemoan the team's relief pitchers, quickly grew frustrated with the team's reluctance to place Britton on the major league roster, or use him when available. This unwillingness to use the pitcher has been dubbed "Brittongate." General manager Brian Cashman expressed confidence in Britton: "He has not failed in any capacity at any level. Every chance he’s gotten, he’s had success, period. That’s what defines Chris Britton. I can’t tell you any more than that."

References

External links
, or Pura Pelota (Venezuelan Winter League)
Winter Wonders: All Hail Great Britton Baseball America, January 19, 2005

 
1982 births
Living people
Baltimore Orioles players
Baseball players from Florida
Bluefield Orioles players
Bowie Baysox players
Delmarva Shorebirds players
Frederick Keys players
Gulf Coast Orioles players
Gulf Coast Yankees players
Lincoln Saltdogs players
Major League Baseball pitchers
New York Yankees players
Portland Beavers players
San Antonio Missions players
Scranton/Wilkes-Barre Yankees players
Sportspeople from Hollywood, Florida
Tiburones de La Guaira players
American expatriate baseball players in Venezuela
York Revolution players
Yuma Scorpions players
Plantation High School alumni